John Rufus Sharpe III (October 31, 1909 – April 23, 1996) was an American songwriter, music publishing executive and author. He is best known for "So Rare", published in 1937, which he wrote with composer Jerry Herst.<ref>Social Security Death Index, hosted at www.ancestry.com : "John R. Sharpe, born 31 Oct 1909, died 23 Apr 1996</ref>

Sharpe was born in Berkeley, California, United States, the first of two children of John Rufus Sharpe Jr. and Regina Franvell Walshe. Although his father was not known to be musically inclined, that was not the case with his mother. She achieved some local renown   for her operatic singing and she passed her love of music to her son. Sharpe was distantly related to the singer and entertainer Judy Canova.

"So Rare" was a #2 hit in 1957 for Jimmy Dorsey,The label on the original Fraternity 45rpm record F-755 shows "JIMMY DORSEY" prominently, followed by small print "with Orchestra and Chorus" but it has been recorded by numerous artists including Carl Ravell and his Orchestra (1937), Gus Arnheim and his Coconut Grove Orchestra (1937), Guy Lombardo and his Royal Canadians (1937), Andy Williams (1959), Ella Fitzgerald (1960) and Ray Conniff (1965).All Music Guide: recordings of "So Rare" Sharpe and Herst have four collaborations listed at the performing rights organisation ASCAP, including "So Rare", and a number of other Herst-Sharpe songs are listed at the US Copyright Office.

Sharpe wrote the lyrics to "The Dream Peddler's Serenade" (1950), composed by Johnny Mercer and recorded by Margaret Whiting.Billboard, 18 March 1950, page 21 archived at Google Books

He authored at least one novel, Hogar, Lord of the Asyr'' (1987), published in New American Library's Signet imprint under his full name of John Rufus Sharpe III.

In the mid-1960s, Sharpe formed Rondo Music, and by 1967 he was General Manager of the George E. Primrose Music Co, Mill Valley, California. In 1970 he married Josephine Tumminia, an opera singer who had recorded with the Jimmy Dorsey Orchestra in 1937. At the time of his death he had last resided in San Mateo, California, but he died in Santa Cruz County.

References

External links
 Lead sheet for "So Rare" at Wikifonia

1909 births
1996 deaths
Songwriters from California
American music publishers (people)
20th-century American musicians
20th-century American businesspeople